Gina Joy Carano (born April 16, 1982) is an American actress and former mixed martial artist. She competed in EliteXC and Strikeforce from 2006 to 2009, where she compiled a 7–1 record. Her popularity led to her being called the "face of women's MMA", although Carano rejected this title. She and Cris Cyborg were the first women to headline a major MMA event during their 2009 Strikeforce bout. Carano retired from competition after her first professional MMA defeat to Cyborg.

Transitioning from the ring to the screen, Carano landed her first major role as the lead of the action film Haywire (2011), which was followed by appearances in Fast & Furious 6 (2013) and Deadpool (2016). Carano also portrayed Cara Dune in the first two seasons of the Disney+ space Western series The Mandalorian from 2019 to 2020. In 2021, following a series of controversial posts she made on social media, Lucasfilm fired Carano.

Early life
Carano was born in Dallas County, Texas, and raised in Las Vegas, Nevada, the daughter of Dana Joy Cason and casino executive and former professional football player Glenn Carano. She is the middle child of three sisters. She was raised by her mother after her parents divorced when Gina was 7. She has said that her family celebrates "an Italian festival" every year, though she is of a "small percentage of Italian" descent.

Carano graduated from Trinity Christian High School in Las Vegas where she led the girls' basketball team to a state title. She also played volleyball and softball. She attended the University of Nevada, Reno for a year and then University of Nevada, Las Vegas for three years, majoring in psychology.

Mixed martial arts career
Carano started her career in the sport of Muay Thai. Her then-boyfriend Kevin Ross, a pro Muay Thai fighter, got her involved. After achieving a Muay Thai record of 12–1–1, Carano received an offer from Jamie Levine to participate in the first-ever sanctioned female MMA bout in Nevada with World Extreme Fighting to fight Leiticia Pestovа (a bout Carano won in 38 seconds). She was invited to the World Pro Fighting show in Las Vegas to fight Rosi Sexton. Carano won the fight by knocking out Sexton late in the second round.

Carano faced Elaina Maxwell at Strikeforce: Triple Threat on December 8, 2006. She won the fight via unanimous decision. Carano proved critics wrong when she defeated Maxwell for the second time; the first victory coming in a Muay Thai bout. The fight was the first female fight in Strikeforce. She fought on the February 10, 2007 Showtime EliteXC card, defeating Julie Kedzie via unanimous decision in what was called the "Fight of the Night". The fight was the first televised female fight on Showtime. Her scheduled bout against Jan Finney at the EliteXC/K-1 Dynamite!! USA event on June 2, 2007, was canceled due to illness. The Fight Network and other news outlets reported that she was rushed to the hospital by ambulance for dehydration while attending a World Extreme Cagefighting event as a spectator.

Carano fought on the September 15, 2007 Showtime EliteXC card, where she defeated Tonya Evinger via rear-naked choke for her first career win by submission. Carano impressed critics by holding her own on the ground before submitting Evinger late in the first round. Carano defeated former HOOKnSHOOT Champion Kaitlin Young at EliteXC: Primetime on May 31, 2008. Carano agreed to forfeit 12.5% of her "show" purse to Young, and the fight remained on the card.

Leading up to her fight against Kelly Kobold, there was much controversy over whether Carano would make weight for the fight, as she had fought only once in the past year and had failed to make weight. Carano assured critics that she would be able to make weight since she had hired a nutritionist to help with her dieting.

Early on, Kobold was intent on pressing Carano in the clinch, while working for the takedown throughout the fight. Kobold managed a takedown in the second round, but the round ended before she could take meaningful advantage of it. Carano worked her opportunities by hitting Kobold at every turn whenever the fighters separated while opening a huge gash on the inside of her opponent's eyebrow in the first round. At the end of the third round, Carano looked to finish the fight as she unloaded a head kick that landed flush on Kobold's chin, but Kobold remained on her feet and the bout came to a close. Carano won by unanimous decision (30–27, 30–27, and 29–28).

Strikeforce Women's Lightweight Championship bout 

After Strikeforce purchased the assets of ProElite, Carano, along with other fighters within the defunct promotion, became contractually linked with Strikeforce after many months of a stalemate regarding their free agent status.

It was announced at Strikeforce: Lawler vs. Shields that Carano's fight against Cris Cyborg would take place on August 15, 2009, at Strikeforce: Carano vs. Cyborg. Strikeforce created their first Women's Championship for the bout. Though the 145-pound division is most commonly referred to as featherweight, Strikeforce CEO Scott Coker stated that the title would be known as the Strikeforce Women's Lightweight Championship. The title was later renamed the Strikeforce Women's Middleweight Championship. Carano lost the fight against Cyborg by TKO at 4:59 in the first round, giving her first-ever loss in her professional MMA career.

In November 2010, Strikeforce CEO Scott Coker stated he was hopeful that she would return in 2011. Carano's return was formally announced in February 2011, and Strikeforce announced at its April 9, 2011, event in San Diego that Carano would make her return against Sarah D'Alelio on June 18, during the Overeem vs. Werdum Strikeforce event in Dallas. This bout would have been held by Zuffa, who have been detractors of women's MMA in the past. Critics asserted that the reason for the turnaround was Carano's marketability. However, the fight did not take place. Initially, Strikeforce announced Carano failed her pre-fight medical examination and the fight was pulled from the card. Later, it became public that Carano was medically cleared by the Athletic Commission but was removed from the card for other reasons.

In April 2014, during an appearance on The Arsenio Hall Show Carano said she was considering a return to MMA. In September 2014, Dana White of the UFC said contract negotiations with Carano had stalled. During her appearance on the Joe Rogan Experience 690 podcast, Ronda Rousey said a fight between Gina Carano and her had been planned for December 2014, but never materialized.

Carano has not fought since August 2009 and is not scheduled for any upcoming events. Carano is still under contract with the UFC through her old Strikeforce contract and has four fights remaining on that contract.

Television and film career

2000s 
Carano starred in the 2005 film Ring Girls. Based on true events, Ring Girls is about five American women from Las Vegas who attempt to fight the best Muay Thai fighters in the world. Along with Lisa King, Carano served as a mentor to aspiring fighters in the 2007 Oxygen reality series Fight Girls. She appeared as "Crush" on the NBC show American Gladiators, in which she starred in the workout video of the show along with Monica Carlson (Jet), Jennifer Widerstrom (Phoenix), Michael O'Hearn (Titan), Tanoai Reed (Toa) and Don "Hollywood" Yates (Wolf). The DVD was released on December 16, 2008.

She appeared in Command & Conquer: Red Alert 3 as Natasha, portraying the Soviet sniper/commando in various cut scenes. She is featured in the Michael Jai White film Blood and Bone (2009).

2010s 
In September 2009, Carano landed the leading role in the spy thriller Haywire (2011), directed by Steven Soderbergh. 
Christy Lemire of the Associated Press stated: "[Carano's] dialogue delivery may seem a bit stiff—and she has acknowledged that Soderbergh made some tweaks to her voice in post-production—but she has tremendous presence: an intriguing mix of muscular power and eye-catching femininity." Newsweek said Carano's martial-arts experience gives her "an unparalleled physicality" in the role. She described her knockout fight with co-star Michael Fassbender:

In February 2012, Carano was cast in In the Blood (2014), an action thriller directed by John Stockwell.

In 2012, Carano was cast as the lead in an all-female ensemble action film, tentatively titled The ExpendaBelles, that would have been part of The Expendables film franchise. Producer Adi Shankar said, "I don't know how I'm supposed to make a movie that is supposed to be the female version of The Expendables without Gina Carano in it. It would be like making Twix without caramel or Jamba Juice without Jamba." The project has yet to materialize.

Carano co-starred in Fast & Furious 6 (2013) as a member of Special Agent Luke Hobbs' (Dwayne Johnson) Diplomatic Security Service team. Several critics praised Carano's performance; Richard Roeper of the Chicago Sun-Times wrote, "Gina Carano is BIG fun to watch. [She] is still a bit stilted with her line readings, but her two fight scenes with Michelle Rodriguez are just epic." while Matt Goldberg of Collider.com wrote that the scene would "create a lot of new Gina Carano fans."

In July 2013, she and comic book creator Rob Liefeld announced they were working on a big-screen adaptation of Liefied's Avengelyne in which Carano would star as the titular character. Carano appeared in the 2013–2014 Fox series Almost Human episode "Unbound", where she played the part of an XRN combat android named Danica. She co-starred in the 2015 film Extraction, and she played Angel Dust in the 2016 film Deadpool.

In 2018, she was cast in The Mandalorian, Lucasfilm's first live-action Star Wars television series. She portrayed the character Cara Dune with a first appearance in the fourth episode of the first season titled "Chapter 4: Sanctuary". Carano initially believed she would be playing the role of a female Wookiee, and was surprised to "find that [she] was one of the few people that you were actually going to see her face." She played the role in seasons 1 and 2.

2020s 
Lucasfilm announced in February 2021 that Carano would not appear in future Star Wars projects following a series of controversial posts she made to social media, stating "... her social media posts denigrating people based on their cultural and religious identities are abhorrent and unacceptable." The same day she was dropped by the United Talent Agency.

A week later, Carano announced she would be developing, producing, and starring in a new film project with conservative media company The Daily Wire. The film, White Knuckle, was to be about revenge by a survivor of an attempted murder by a serial killer. The film was scheduled to begin production in October 2021 in Tennessee, Utah, and Montana.  In the U.S., it was to be released exclusively to subscribers of The Daily Wire, and was to be released internationally by Voltage Pictures.

In  May 2021, Carano appeared as a guest on an episode of the show Running Wild with Bear Grylls.

In November 2021, Carano was tapped to play a secret service agent in My Son Hunter, a biopic on Hunter Biden directed by Robert Davi.

Political views
In late 2020, Carano clashed with activists on Twitter, who criticized her lack of public support for the Black Lives Matter movement, leading to accusations of racism. Weeks later, after facing calls from some fans to put her gender pronouns in her Twitter profile, she added the words "beep/bop/boop". This ridicule led to accusations of transphobia. She later apologized and removed them, saying that The Mandalorian actor Pedro Pascal had helped her understand the use of preferred pronouns.

In February 2021, Carano shared an Instagram post that compared "hating someone for their political views" to the persecution of Jews during the Holocaust and included an image taken during the Lviv pogroms. Many critics interpreted the post as comparing American conservatives to Jews in Nazi Germany. Shortly afterward, Lucasfilm stated that Carano was no longer employed by the company, saying that "her social media posts denigrating people based on their cultural and religious identities are abhorrent and unacceptable". Her posting of a series of tweets in which she mocked the use of face masks during the COVID-19 pandemic in the United States was also cited by Lucasfilm as well as her repeated belief of voter fraud during the 2020 presidential election.

In February 2022, Carano explained her offending post, saying that she "shared a meme, I translated into: Don't let the government pit you against each other or history tells us that could go wrong." Some fans and commentators contrasted Carano's firing with fellow The Mandalorian cast member Pedro Pascal suffering no consequence for making comparisons between the treatment of Jews in concentration camps and the treatment of undocumented migrant children at ICE detention facilities in the US. Carano was defended by The Mandalorian co-star Bill Burr, who described her as "an absolute sweetheart" and criticized her firing.

By fall 2021, the White Knuckle project had been cancelled at Carano's behest, due to her unwillingness to comply with Hollywood's COVID-19 mask and vaccine requirements.  She stated, "After we announced our first project this summer, the Hollywood unions started debating vaccine mandates for cast and crew, and I wasn't into that. I don't believe anybody gets to make your medical choices for you, and I'm not willing to force masks and vaccines on anyone else."  Daily Wire co-founder and co-CEO Jeremy Boreing recalled Carano's demand to "find a different movie", and her statement, "To hell with it, I'll quit my union. Let's make a movie up in Montana where they can't get after us." The group began production on the replacement film, a Western entitled Terror on the Prairie, that was released exclusively to Daily Wire subscribers in June 2022.

In February 2022, Carano suggested that the 2022 Russian invasion of Ukraine was a government conspiracy to control the public through fear, started because "they" had "lost control of the covid narrative".

Accolades
Carano was profiled in a feature story for the ESPN series E:60. She was voted "Hottest Woman In America" by Big Biz Magazine in the Spring 2008 issue. On May 13, 2008, "Gina Carano" was the fastest-rising search on Google and third-most-searched person on Yahoo!, and ranked no. 5 on Yahoo!'s "Top Ten Influential Women of 2008" list.

In May 2009, Carano was ranked no. 16 on Maxims Hot 100 list. She is one of the cover athletes along with Serena Williams for the October 19, 2009, edition of ESPN The Magazines Body Issue.

She was a nominee for the 2013 Critics Choice Awards for best actress in an action movie for Haywire.

Awards

 2008 World MMA Awards Female Fighter of the Year
 2012 AOCA / Awakening Outstanding Contribution Award
 2012 ActionFest Film Festival, Chick Norris Award for Best Female Action Star

Mixed martial arts record

|-
| Loss
| align=center| 7–1
| Cris Cyborg
| TKO (punches) 
| Strikeforce: Carano vs. Cyborg
| 
| align=center| 1
| align=center| 4:59
| San Jose, California, United States
| 
|-
| Win
| align=center| 7–0
| Kelly Kobold
| Decision (unanimous)
| EliteXC: Heat
| 
| align=center| 3
| align=center| 3:00
| Sunrise, Florida, United States
|
|-
| Win
| align=center| 6–0
| Kaitlin Young
| TKO (doctor stoppage)
| EliteXC: Primetime
| 
| align=center| 2
| align=center| 3:00
| Newark, New Jersey, United States
|
|-
| Win
| align=center| 5–0
| Tonya Evinger
| Submission (rear-naked choke)
| EliteXC: Uprising
| 
| align=center| 1
| align=center| 2:53
| Oahu, Hawaii, United States
| 
|-
| Win
| align=center| 4–0
| Julie Kedzie
| Decision (unanimous)
| EliteXC: Destiny
| 
| align=center| 3
| align=center| 3:00
| Southaven, Mississippi, United States
| 
|-
| Win
| align=center| 3–0
| Elaina Maxwell
| Decision (unanimous)
| Strikeforce: Triple Threat
| 
| align=center| 3
| align=center| 2:00
| San Jose, California, United States
| 
|-
| Win
| align=center| 2–0
| Rosi Sexton
| KO (punch)
| World Pro Fighting Championships 1
| 
| align=center| 2
| align=center| 4:55
| Las Vegas, Nevada, United States
| 
|-
| Win
| align=center| 1–0
| Leiticia Pestova
| KO (punches and elbows)
| World Extreme Fighting
| 
| align=center| 1
| align=center| 0:38
| Las Vegas, Nevada, United States
|

Filmography

Film

Television

Video games

See also
 List of Strikeforce alumni
 List of female mixed martial artists
 List of female kickboxers

Notes

References

External links

 Gina Carano with ESPN.com 2009
 American Gladiators Crush Profile (GladiatorsTV.com)
 American Gladiators Profile
 Goodman, Justine (October 2, 2013). "Gina Carano Has A New Movie, 'In The Blood', So Let's Revisit Her Maxim Photo Shoot!". Maxim.
 

1982 births
21st-century American actresses
Actresses from Dallas
Actresses from Las Vegas
American female kickboxers
American female mixed martial artists
American film actresses
American television actresses
American people of Italian descent
American Muay Thai practitioners
American practitioners of Brazilian jiu-jitsu
American video game actresses
American women television personalities
Conservatism in the United States
Featherweight mixed martial artists
Mixed martial artists utilizing Muay Thai
Mixed martial artists utilizing Gaidojutsu
Mixed martial artists utilizing Brazilian jiu-jitsu
Female Brazilian jiu-jitsu practitioners
Female models from Nevada
Female models from Texas
Female Muay Thai practitioners
Kickboxers from Nevada
Kickboxers from Texas
Living people
Mixed martial artists from Nevada
Mixed martial artists from Texas
Sportspeople from Las Vegas
Sportspeople from Dallas
The Daily Wire people
University of Nevada, Las Vegas alumni
University of Nevada, Reno alumni
Television personalities from Texas